Neromia picticosta is a moth of the family Geometridae first described by Louis Beethoven Prout in 1913. It is found in Madagascar.

It has a wingspan of 22 mm. The wings are dull bluish green, irrorated (sprinkled) with white. The face is dark red, the thorax and abdomen dorsally green.

This species was described from a specimen from Antananarivo.

References

Moths described in 1913
Geometrinae
Moths of Madagascar
Endemic fauna of Madagascar